Frederick D. Coffin (January 16, 1943 – July 31, 2003) was an American film actor, singer, songwriter, and musician.

Early life
Coffin was born in Detroit, Michigan in 1943 to actress Winifred Deforest Coffin and writer Dean Coffin, and was one of five children. He was educated at Western Reserve Academy in Hudson, Ohio, where he studied theater and was also a serious athlete, graduating in 1961. He enrolled the University of Michigan in 1962, where he intended to play football but instead decided to focus on acting, earning a B.A. then a master's degree in theater.

Career
Coffin made his screen debut in 1973 when he appeared in the television film Much Ado About Nothing, an adaptation of the play, in which he also starred. He appeared in his first feature film in 1976 in the drama Dragonfly, with Beau Bridges and Susan Sarandon.  His second feature was the Golden Globe nominated King of the Gypsies, with Shelley Winters. During the 1980s, Coffin appeared in several films: the horror film Alone in the Dark, which starred Donald Pleasence, Without a Trace, Mothers Day (1980) Credited as Holden McGuire Nothing Lasts Forever, the biography film Jo Jo Dancer, Your Life Is Calling with Richard Pryor, the action comedy A Fine Mess with Ted Danson, and The Bedroom Window. In the 1990s, Coffin continued to appear in films, one of which he is known for is the comedy film Wayne's World, with Mike Myers and Dana Carvey, and the Steven Seagal film Hard to Kill. He would appear in two final films before his death in 2003: View from the Top with Gwyneth Paltrow, and Identity with John Cusack.

Although, it was in fact television that Coffin appeared in mostly throughout his career, his first appearance in a television series was in Great Performances, which starred actors such as Walter Cronkite, who presented the series, Julie Andrews and Liza Minnelli. He also made guest appearances in many well known series including Kojak, Hill Street Blues, Moonlighting, The Twilight Zone, Remington Steele, Dallas, in which he appeared for six episodes, L.A. Law, The X-Files, Walker, Texas Ranger, Murder, She Wrote, Dr. Quinn, Medicine Woman, and the soap operas Ryan's Hope and The Edge of Night.

Coffin starred in many television films including Under Siege, the 1989 miniseries Lonesome Dove and the 1995 film adaptation of A Streetcar Named Desire. He was originally cast as the voice of the father in the series Family Dog, he was later replaced by actor Martin Mull.

He also had roles in theater, including playing Eliot Rosewater in the 1979 premier of Ashman and Menken's musical adaptation of Kurt Vonnegut's God Bless You, Mr. Rosewater.

In 1997, he returned to his alma mater as that year's Knight Fellow, one of Western Reserve Academy's most distinguished honors.

Coffin was also a talented singer, songwriter, and musician.

Personal life and death
Coffin was married to actress Barbara Monte-Britton from September 25, 1977, to his death on July 31, 2003, from lung cancer; he was a long-time chain smoker.

Filmography

References

External links

1943 births
2003 deaths
Male actors from Michigan
American male film actors
American male television actors
Deaths from lung cancer in California
20th-century American male actors
21st-century American male actors
American male voice actors
University of Michigan School of Music, Theatre & Dance alumni
Western Reserve Academy alumni